Fuyu Yoshida (born 23 November 1997) is a Japanese swimmer. He competed in the men's 200 metre freestyle event at the 2018 FINA World Swimming Championships (25 m), in Hangzhou, China.

References

External links
 

1997 births
Living people
Japanese male freestyle swimmers
Place of birth missing (living people)
21st-century Japanese people